Oil on Water is a 2010 petrofiction novel by Nigerian author Helon Habila. The novel documents the experience of two journalists as they try to rescue a kidnapped European wife in the oil landscape of the Niger Delta. The novel explores themes of both the ecological and political consequences of oil conflict and petrodollars in the delta.

The novel was well received. Orion magazine called the novel successful, "a powerful work, one that reaffirms that art done well is always big enough to contain politics". A review in the Guardian called the book a "powerful, accomplished third novel [which] displays a growing pessimism about journalism's capacity to effect change."

Awards 

 2011 Commonwealth Writers Prize, shortlist
 2012 Orion Book Award, shortlist
 2012 PEN/Open Book Award, shortlist

References 

2010 Nigerian novels
Petrofiction